Dipsas indica, also known as the neotropical snail-eater, is a snake species found in South America. It feeds on slugs and snails, which the snake can extract from their shells using its slender jaw.

There are two subspecies:
 Dipsas indica indica Laurenti, 1768
 Dipsas indica ecuadoriensis Peters, 1960

References

Colubrids
indica
Snakes of South America
Reptiles of Bolivia
Reptiles of Brazil
Reptiles of Colombia
Reptiles of Ecuador
Reptiles of French Guiana
Reptiles of Guyana
Reptiles of Peru
Reptiles of Suriname
Reptiles of Venezuela
Reptiles described in 1768
Taxa named by Josephus Nicolaus Laurenti